RNLB Louisa Heartwell (ON 495) was the sixth lifeboat to be stationed at Cromer on the coast of the English county of Norfolk She was launched from the beach station and was on station from 1902 to 1932. During her period on station at Cromer the Louisa Heartwell had only two coxswains during her 29-year career. They were Matthew James Buttons Harrison until his retirement in 1909, and then Henry George Blogg.

Louisa Heartwell 'Retires' to The Historic Lifeboat Collection 
In 1996, Louisa Heartwell arrived in Chichester by road and was used as a houseboat, until she was acquired in 2019 by Premier Marinas, who in April 2020 donated her to the RNLI for restoration and display. As of 25 March 2021, she is now on display at the Historic Lifeboat Collection in Chatham, Kent.

New lifeboat house
With the arrival of the new Liverpool-class Pulling and Sailing lifeboat Louisa Heartwell, Cromer also got a new lifeboat house. This was needed as the new lifeboat and her carriage were much larger than the previous lifeboat . The new lifeboat house was opened in 1902 and remained in use until the 1960s, when it then became the lifeboat museum. With the advent of the new Henry Blogg Museum, this building is once again a lifeboat house, and is used by Cromer's inshore lifeboat

Notable rescues

Steamship Fernebo
The Swedish cargo steamer was laden with timber when on 9 January 1917 an explosion in the ship's boiler broke the Fernebo in two. The Cromer Lifeboat Louise Heartwell with coxswain Henry Blogg at the helm had been at sea for several hours in difficult conditions attending the Greek steamer Pyrin. Blogg and his exhausted crew were now asked to attend the Fernebo. The sea conditions were so bad that the lifeboat was unable to clear the beach. Meanwhile, the crew of the Fernebo had managed to launch a small boat from the stricken vessel. Aboard were six crew members but the little boat was capsized in the surf. All six of the little boat's occupants were rescued from the waves through efforts of rescuers on the beach. In the late afternoon the Fernebo's two halves had grounded. One half was alongside a wooden groyne with the other, half a mile to the east. After failed attempts to make a further rescue with rocket apparatus, the Louise Heartwell launched again at 9:30 pm. During this attempt the lifeboat lost three oars and five of her oars were smashed. Not to be beaten, once more with spare oars and after some rest, Blogg and his crew launched to the Fernebo. This time the lifeboat managed to get alongside the wreck long enough to rescue the eleven remaining crewmen. The lifeboat returned to the shore at 1:00 am to a cheering crowd who had stayed to watch the rescue from the beach. Henry Blogg and his crew had been at sea for fourteen hours. For this action Henry Blogg received an RNLI Gold Medal. Acting second Coxswain William Davies was awarded the Silver Medal and twelve of the crew were awarded the Bronze Medal, the first time the RNLI Bronze Medal had been awarded. Part of the wreck of the Fernebo remains and can sometimes be seen on Cromer beach at low tide opposite the Doctor's Steps.

Service and rescues

Notes and references

Cromer lifeboats
1902 ships
Liverpool-class lifeboats